The Headless Ritual is the sixth studio album by Autopsy, released in 2013 through Peaceville Records. It is the second album since the band's 2009 reunion.

Background
Autopsy reunited in 2009, and released Macabre Eternal in May 2011, toured and released the Born Undead DVD in 2012. Autopsy announced on October 23, 2012 that they were preparing to enter the studio, saying in a press release that the album would be their "heaviest, darkest and most devastating album to date." They also predicted a mid-2013 release, and recorded the album in early April 2013. It would be the second album to feature the reunion lineup of Chris Reifert, Eric Cutler, Danny Coralles and Joe Trevisano.

Track listing

Personnel
Autopsy
Eric Cutler – guitar, vocals on "Running From the Goathead"
Danny Coralles – guitar
Joe Trevisano – bass
Chris Reifert – drums, vocals
Production
Adam Munoz – recording, mixing
Joe Pentagno – cover art

References

Autopsy (band) albums
2013 albums